Artsiom Krautsou is a Belarusian karateka. He won one of the bronze medals in the men's kumite 67 kg event at the 2019 European Games held in Minsk, Belarus.

In 2018, he competed in the men's 67 kg event at the World Karate Championships held in Madrid, Spain.

Achievements

References 

Living people
Year of birth missing (living people)
Place of birth missing (living people)
Belarusian male karateka
European Games bronze medalists for Belarus
European Games medalists in karate
Karateka at the 2019 European Games
21st-century Belarusian people